Linda Vista is a neighborhood in Pasadena, California. It is one of Pasadena's wealthiest neighborhoods, and its largest by area. It is bordered by Oak Grove Drive to the north, Colorado Boulevard to the south, the Pasadena-Glendale border to the west, and Linda Vista Avenue to the east.

Landmarks
Linda Vista is built on a slope between the Arroyo Seco and the San Rafael Hills, and is home to the Annandale Golf Club and Art Center College of Design.

Education
Linda Vista is served by San Rafael Elementary School, Eliot Middle School, and Muir High School. Flintridge Sacred Heart Academy, Chandler School, Mayfield Grammar School, Mayfield Senior School, Maranatha High School, Westridge School, and Polytechnic School are private schools in the area.

Transportation
Linda Vista is served by Metro Local lines 180 and 256. The neighborhood is also served by Pasadena Transit routes 51 and 52.

Government
Linda Vista is part of City Council District 6, represented by Steve Madison.

Neighborhoods in Pasadena, California